The Grandes études de Paganini, S. 141, are a series of six études for the piano by Franz Liszt, revised in 1851 from an earlier version (published as , S. 140, in 1838). It is almost exclusively in the final version that these pieces are played today.

The pieces are all based on the compositions of Niccolò Paganini for violin, and are among the most technically demanding pieces in the piano literature (especially the original versions, before Liszt revised them, thinning the textures and removing some of the more outrageous technical difficulties). The pieces run the gamut of technical hurdles, and frequently require very large stretches by the performer of an eleventh (although all stretches greater than a tenth were removed from the revised versions).

Études

Étude
Original version (1838), S. 140 – Dedicated to madame Clara Schumann
Étude No. 1 in G minor (Preludio: Andante; Non troppo lento, cantabile) ("Tremolo") – after Paganini's 24 Caprices for Solo Violin No. 6 (with the introduction and coda of No. 5). Begins with a prelude of rapid arpeggios and scales and then enters the main étude section; as the name suggests, the piece is meant to employ tremolos. Voicing and dynamics are important in "Tremolo", and adding to its difficulty is the fact that many tremolos are marked to be played by the left hand only.
Étude No. 2 in E major (Andantino capricciosamente) – after Caprice No. 17. Contains many rapid scales and octaves and requires elegance and quality of tone.
Étude No. 3 in A minor (Allegro moderato) – after the final movement of Paganini's Violin Concerto No. 2 in B minor, and containing the first theme of the final movement of Paganini's Violin Concerto No. 1 in E major.
Étude No. 4 in E major (Andante quasi allegretto) – after Caprice No. 1.
Étude No. 5 in E major (Allegretto, dolcissimo) ("La Chasse") – after Caprice No. 9.
Étude No. 6 in A minor (Quasi presto, a capriccio) – after Caprice No. 24, with a slightly altered theme and 11 variations. The technically demanding work abounds with rapid octaves, scales, and arpeggios.

Grandes études de Paganini

Revised version (1851), S. 141 – dedicated to madame Clara Schumann
Étude No. 1 in G minor (Preludio, Andante; Etude – Non troppo lento) ("Tremolo") – after Caprice No. 6 (with the introduction and coda No. 5).
Étude No. 2 in E major (Andante capriccioso) – after Caprice No. 17.
Étude No. 3 in G minor (Allegretto) ("La campanella") – after the final movement of Paganini's Violin Concerto No. 2 in B minor.
Étude No. 4 in E major (Vivo) ("Arpeggio") – after Caprice No. 1. Written on one line only, omitting the usual separate line for the left hand. Furthermore, its lowest tone is the G3, the score thus mimicking a score for violin.
Étude No. 5 in E major (La Chasse) (Allegretto) – after Caprice No. 9.
Étude No. 6 in A minor (Quasi presto, a capriccio) – after Caprice No. 24.

See also
 List of variations on a theme by another composer

References

External links 
 

Paganini
1851 compositions
1838 compositions
Compositions for solo piano
Music dedicated to family or friends